Sir Charles Frederick Hamond (1817 – 2 March 1905) was a Conservative Party politician.

Hamond first stood for election at the 1874 Newcastle-upon-Tyne by-election, but was unsuccessful. However, he was then elected for the seat at the 1874 election, but was beaten again in 1880. He continued to fight for the seat, standing in 1885 and an 1886 by-election, before being elected to the seat again in 1892. He held the seat until 1900 when he did not seek re-election.

References

External links
 

Conservative Party (UK) MPs for English constituencies
UK MPs 1892–1895
UK MPs 1895–1900
UK MPs 1874–1880
1817 births
1905 deaths